Viimeinen Atlantis (in English The Last Atlantis) is the fourth album by Finnish thrash metal band Stam1na. It was released on February 10, 2010. It features keyboardist Emil Lähteenmäki for the first time as a permanent band member.

The album's lyrics deal with climate change and consumption culture. "The album is a record from an era in which the warning signs were visible for everyone. The water level rises but the map is burning: it is time to choose a direction and start running", commented lyricist Antti Hyyrynen.

The band opened on December 9, 2009 a specific website at viimeinenatlantis.fi domain where the album story was revealed panel by panel in a comic format. In addition to a normal jewelcase CD, the album was released as a vinyl and as a book version, which includes the comic and Joonas Brandt's photo reportage of the album recording. In February 2020, 10 years after the album, novel Viimeinen Atlantis was released. It is first novel by member of the band Antti Hyyrynen.

Track listing
 "S.O.S. (Salatkaa oma sijaintinne)" – 2:04 "S.O.S. (Conceal Your Location)"
 "Piste jolta ei ollut paluuta" – 5:06 "The Point of No Return"
 "Pakkolasku" – 3:15 "Emergency Landing / Must-Pay Bill"
 "Jäteputkiaivot" – 3:08 "Waste Pipe Brain"
 "Maalla, merellä, ilmassa" – 4:15 "On Land, At Sea, On Air"
 "Elämän tarkoitus" – 4:10 "The Meaning of Life"
 "Viestintuoja" – 3:54 "The Messenger"
 "Rikkipää" – 4:20 "Sulfur Head"
 "Tsunami" – 5:31
 "Eloonjäänyt" – 5:55 "The Survivor"
 "Viimeinen Atlantis" – 5:21 "The Last Atlantis"

Personnel
 Antti Hyyrynen – vocals, guitar
 Kai-Pekka Kangasmäki – bass guitar, vocals
 Emil Lähteenmäki – keyboards
 Pekka Olkkonen – lead guitar
 Teppo Velin – drums, percussion

Additional musicians
 Timo Mäkynen – voice on track 1
 Sonja Nurmela – backing vocals
 Antti Junttila – backing vocals
 Perttu Kivilaakso – cello on track 10

Charts

References

External links
 Album website
 Album production diary at band's site
  

2010 albums
Stam1na albums